Lorenza Villegas Restrepo (5 October 1899 – 25 March 1960) was the wife of the 15th President, Eduardo Santos Montejo, and served as First Lady of Colombia from 1938 to 1942.

Personal life
Born 5 October 1899 in Santa Rosa de Cabal, at that time Caldas, currently Risaralda to José Antonio Villegas y Villegas y de Carlota Restrepo Botero. On 25 November 1917 she married Eduardo Santos Montejo, whom she had met through her brother, Alfonso Villegas Restrepo, founder and owner of El Tiempo who sold the newspaper to Santos in 1913. Together they had one daughter, Clara, who died of scarlet fever at the age of three. Lorenza died on 25 March 1960 in New York City.

References

1890s births
1960 deaths
People from Risaralda Department
Santos family
First ladies of Colombia